Vilma Kuusk (born in 1931) is an Estonian botanist. She deals with the flora of Estonia.

She is the senior curator of Estonian Institute of Zoology and Botany's herbarium.

She has described at least one taxon: subtribe Alliariinae Kuusk, 1973.

Abbreviation

References

Living people
1931 births
20th-century Estonian botanists
Women botanists
21st-century Estonian botanists